George Stevens (1904–1975) was an American film director, producer, screenwriter and cinematographer.

George Stevens may also refer to:

George Stevens (1803–1894), Massachusetts pipe organ manufacturer and politician
George Stevens (jockey) (1833–1871), English jockey
George Asher Stevens (1856–1920), American hotelier and New York State Assemblyman
George Alexander Stevens (1710–1780), English actor, playwright, poet, and songwriter
George Alex Stevens (1875–1954), British songwriter and musical show director
George Barker Stevens (1854–1906), American clergyman, theologian and Yale Divinity School professor
George P. Stevens (1851–1927), Wisconsin State Assemblyman
George Stevens (English footballer) (1910–1987), footballer for New Brighton, Everton, Southend, Stockport and Crewe in the 1930s
George Stevens (Scottish footballer) (1891–?), footballer for Darlington and Crewe in the 1920s
George Stevens (California politician) (1932–2006), San Diego City Council member, minister, activist
George Stevens Jr. (born 1932), American film and television writer, director, producer, and founder of the American Film Institute
George Phillip Stevens (1861–1941), public servant in Australia
George Bridges Stevens, acting commander of the Ceylon Defence Force
George W. Stevens, American civil engineer and architect
George Stevens (EastEnders), fictional character in EastEnders

See also
George Stephens (disambiguation)